Lionel Wafer (1640–1705) was a Welsh explorer, buccaneer and privateer.

A ship's surgeon, Wafer made several voyages to the South Seas and visited Maritime Southeast Asia in 1676. In 1679 he sailed again as a surgeon, soon after settling in Jamaica to practise his profession.

In 1680, Wafer was recruited by buccaneer Edmund Cooke to join a privateering venture under the leadership of Captain Bartholomew Sharp, where he met William Dampier at Cartagena.

After being injured during an overland journey, Wafer was left behind with four others in the Isthmus of Darien in Panama, where he stayed with the Cuna Indians.  He gathered information about their culture, including their shamanism and a short vocabulary of their language.  He studied the natural history of the isthmus.  The following year, Wafer left the Indians promising to return and marry the chief's sister and bring back dogs from England. He fooled the buccaneers at first as he was dressed as an Indian, wearing body-paint and ornamented with a nose-ring.  It took them some time to recognise him.

Wafer reunited with Dampier, and after privateering with him on the Spanish Main until 1688, he settled in Philadelphia.

By 1690 Wafer was back in England and in 1695 he published A New Voyage and Description of the Isthmus of America, which described his adventures.  It was translated into French (1706), German (1759), and Swedish (1789).

The Darien Company hired him as an adviser when it was planning its settlement on the isthmus in 1698.

He died in London in 1705.

References

 A New Voyage and Description of the Isthmus of America, Lionel Wafer. Edited by L.E. Elliott Joyce (Oxford: Hakluyt Society, 1933). Excerpt from the  1729 Knapton edition.
 A Buccaneer More Interested in Nature than Gold, by Cindy Vallar, about Lionel Wafer's and William Dampier's common adventures.

External links

1640 births
1705 deaths
17th-century explorers
British privateers
Explorers of Central America
Welsh explorers